Abgarmak-e Sofla (also Romanized as Ābgarmak-e Soflā; also known as Ābgarmak-e Pā’īn (Persian: آبگرمک پائین), Āb Garmak, and Āb Garmeh-ye Neşār) is a village in Pishkuh-e Zalaqi Rural District, Besharat District, Aligudarz County, Lorestan Province, Iran. At the 2006 census, its population was 35, in 6 families.

References 

Towns and villages in Aligudarz County